Diathesis  (from the Greek διάθεσις "grammatical voice, disposition") may refer to:
Grammatical voice
Diathesis (medical), a hereditary or constitutional predisposition to a disease or other disorder
Predisposition (psychology)
The diathesis–stress model
Bleeding diathesis, an abnormal propensity toward bleeding